Anchiopella is a genus of trilobites in the order Phacopida, which existed in Early Devonian times in what is now South Africa. It was described by Reed in 1907, and the type species is Anchiopella cristagalli, which was originally described as Encrinurus cristagalli by Woodward in 1873.

References

External links
 Anchiopella at the Paleobiology Database

Paleozoic animals of Africa
Calmoniidae
Phacopida genera
Devonian trilobites of Africa